A barracks emperor (also called a "soldier emperor") was a Roman emperor who seized power by virtue of his command of the army. Barracks emperors were especially common from 235 to 284 AD, during the Crisis of the Third Century, which began with the assassination of Severus Alexander. Beginning with Maximinus Thrax, there were approximately fourteen barracks emperors in 33 years, which produced an average reign of a little over two years apiece. The resulting instability in the imperial office and the nearly-constant state of civil war and insurrection threatened to destroy the Roman Empire from within and left it vulnerable to attack from external adversaries.

Background
Unlike previous emperors who had seized power in military coups d'état (Vespasian and Septimius Severus, both from traditional middle-class equestrian stock), the barracks emperors tended to be low-class commoners, often from outlying parts of the empire. The first barracks emperor, Maximinus Thrax, had begun his military career as an enlisted soldier. A barracks emperor could not boast of a distinguished family name or a successful career as a statesman or public servant. Rather, he had only his military career to recommend himself, and his only influence had been though the soldiers loyal to his command.

Some of the soldier emperors were members of the equestrian class who had worked their way up to a sufficient position of influence within their legion that the soldiers would support a bid for power, but that was a risky undertaking because those soldiers could withdraw their support at any time and perhaps shift it to another military leader who looked more promising at the time.

Because the barracks emperors were frequently border commanders, the act of overthrowing the reigning emperor and seizing power for themselves left large gaps in the empire's border defences that could be exploited by  Rome's enemies. That led to the Germanic incursion into Roman territory in the 260s and resulted in the construction of the Aurelian Walls around Rome. The barracks emperors also used state money to pay their troops since no emperor who had come into power by force of arms could afford to allow his soldiers to become disaffected, and public works and infrastructure fell into ruin. To accommodate the vast demands of buying off their soldiers, the state often simply seized private property, which damaged the economy and drove up inflation.

Transition to Dominate era
In 284, a barracks emperor, Diocletian, a cavalry commander, seized power. Diocletian instituted a number of reforms designed to stabilize the empire and the imperial office, brought an end to the Crisis of the Third Century and inaugurated the Dominate era of Roman history.

Although further emperors would don the purple on the basis of military power (such as Constantine I, Valentinian I, and Theodosius I) the phenomenon of the barracks emperors died out, to be replaced in the late imperial era by shadow emperors like Stilicho, Constantius III, Flavius Aëtius, Avitus, Ricimer, Gundobad, Flavius Orestes and Odoacer. They were military strongmen who effectually ruled the empire as imperial generalissimos controlling weak-willed puppet emperors, rather than taking the title themselves.

List

Earlier barracks emperors
When the notion of a barracks emperor is extended to any emperor that was appointed by the army, more emperors whose reign predates the 3rd century can be included:

The first known emperor appointed by the Praetorian Guards was Claudius, who was appointed after the murder of Caligula.
A notable case took place after the murder of emperor Pertinax. Praetorian Guards had come to the point that they simply sold the throne off by auctioning it to the highest bidder and sold it to one of the richest Romans at the time, Didius Julianus.

Roman emperors
Military of ancient Rome